Operation Excess was a series of British supply convoys to Malta, Alexandria and Greece in January 1941. The operation encountered the first presence of Luftwaffe anti-shipping aircraft in the Mediterranean Sea. All the convoyed freighters reached their destinations. The destroyer Gallant was disabled by Italian mines and Axis bombers severely damaged the cruiser Southampton and the aircraft carrier Illustrious.

Background
Italy's declaration of War on 10 June 1940 brought the Second World War to the Mediterranean Sea and placed the Regia Aeronautica astride the traditional British sea route to Indian Ocean ports, while the Regia Marina roughly tripled the numbers of battleships, cruisers and submarines available to challenge British sea power. The Royal Navy had held the eastern Mediterranean and France the western Mediterranean but the Second Armistice at Compiègne removed the French navy from the alliance on 25 June 1940. From bases at Gibraltar and Alexandria, the Royal Navy attempted to convoy supplies to Malta to maintain it as a base in the central Mediterranean. As Italy attacked Egypt from Libya in September 1940 and Greece from Albania in October 1940, the Royal Navy maintained most of their Mediterranean Fleet at Alexandria while Force H at Gibraltar was used for raids. British successes in early November 1940 including halting the Italian offensive in Greece and disabling Italian battleships Littorio, Conte di Cavour and Duilio at the Battle of Taranto provided incentive and opportunity to supply Malta and Greece.

Preparations

Allied
Convoy MC 4 consisted of four freighters at Gibraltar; Clan Cumming, Clan MacDonald and Empire Song carried materiel destined for Piraeus; Essex carried  of seed potatoes,  of ammunition and twelve crated Hawker Hurricanes for Malta.

Convoy MW 5 consisted of the Freighters Breconshire and Clan Macaulay at Alexandria with cargo bound for Malta.

Convoy ME 6 was made up of nine freighters waited at Malta for passage to Alexandria.

Axis
Five hundred anti-shipping aircraft of Fliegerkorps X were being transferred from Norway to Sicily to protect Axis convoys to North Africa and prevent passage of British convoys to Malta.

Battle

6 January 1941

Convoy MC 4 left Gibraltar, feinting toward the Atlantic, before turning toward Malta after dark, to mislead Axis agents near Gibraltar.

7 January
Force H sailed from Gibraltar to cover convoy MC 4. Force A, Force D and convoy MW 5 with Force C sailed from Alexandria and Force B sailed from the Aegean toward Malta. Force A was located by Italian air reconnaissance that afternoon.

8 January
Force B landed its passengers in Malta and proceeded west to meet convoy MC 4.  Vickers Wellington bombers raided Naples damaging Giulio Cesare with three near misses and causing the only operational Italian battleship Vittorio Veneto to retreat from the approaching convoys.

9 January
Two SM.79s were shot down by Fairey Fulmars from Ark Royal and a later attack by 15 Fiat CR.42 Falcos carrying  bombs also failed. Force H left convoy MC 4 that afternoon after Ark Royal launched six Swordfish for the defence of Malta; Force A joined convoy MC 4 at dusk.

10 January

Bonaventure was slightly damaged and two men killed; 75 per cent of her ammunition was expended in the engagement. Two of Vega crew survived. Right after the engagement, which pushed the British convoy too far south of their route, Gallant struck a naval mine at 08:35. The bow was destroyed and 65 men were killed. Mohawk took Gallant in tow toward Malta while the Force B cruisers provided protection from air attacks. Convoys MC 4 and MW 5 arrived at Malta and convoy ME 6 departed for Alexandria.

Fulmars from Illustrious shot down an Italian aircraft shadowing Force A at 09:30. Valiant avoided torpedoes launched by two SM.79s approaching under the radar horizon at 12:30.  As the combat air patrol Fulmars dropped altitude to engage the SM.79s, Force A was attacked at 12:35 by 18 He 111s of KG 26 and 43 Ju 87s of StG 1 and StG 2 escorted by 10 Bf 110s of ZG 26.  Illustrious completed launching Fulmar and Swordfish patrol aircraft as the attack developed. Illustrious was the main target and was enveloped in waterspouts and mist of exploding bombs. Some bombers diving from an altitude of 12,000 feet delayed bomb release until they pulled-out lower than the height of Illustrious funnel. The five air patrol Fulmars had not returned from chasing the SM.79s which attacked Valiant and the four recently launched Fulmars were unable to gain altitude rapidly enough to break up the attack. The Fulmars claimed eight enemy aircraft during the bombing of Force A as they shuttled to Malta airfields to refuel and re-arm.  Warspite was lightly damaged by a bomb.  Illustrious was hit by five bombs, including one which failed to explode and a near miss disabled her rudder mechanism. A bomb striking a lowered elevator caused extensive hangar damage, with many casualties among aircraft maintenance personnel, nine Swordfish and five Fulmars destroyed. At 15:30 Illustrious headed for Malta steering with engines. The bombing attacks continued. Seven SM.79s were discouraged by heavy anti-aircraft fire but an attack by six Italian Ju 87s at 16:00 scored another bomb hit and two near misses. Fourteen German Ju 87s missed Valiant and Janus and a later attack by 14 He 111s was similarly ineffective. Illustrious reached Malta at 21:30 and would suffer 126 dead and 91 wounded by the time she departed from Malta.

11 January
Gallant was beached in Malta's Grand Harbor at dawn and never repaired. As Mohawk and the Force B cruisers steamed from Malta to rejoin Force A, they were surprised by 12 Ju 87R dive bombers of II/St.G.2 attacking out of the sun at 15:20. Force H returned to Gibraltar.

12 January

13 January
Convoy ME 6 arrived at Alexandria.

The Illustrious blitz
What Maltese called the Illustrious Blitz began when bomb stocks depleted during the attacks of 10 and 11 January were replenished and the Axis made a maximum effort to destroy Illustrious before she could be repaired. Illustrious and Essex were hit during an air raid on 16 January. Ten Macchi C.202s, ten CR.42s and twenty Bf 110s escorted 44 Ju 87s. Bombs exploding in Grand Harbour killed numerous fish, that were collected after the raid and eaten. Illustrious was not seriously damaged but a bomb exploded in Essex engine room killing 15 men and wounding 23 more. There was another heavy air raid on 17 January and Illustrious was again hit in an air raid on 18 January.  Illustrious was not damaged by the last big attack on 19 January.  Illustrious departed Malta on 23 January but her Fulmars remained for the defence of the island.  Illustrious was able to complete additional repairs after reaching Alexandria on 25 January but restoration of full combat effectiveness required a trip to United States shipyards.

Losses
Fairey Fulmar fighters and AA gunners of the Royal Navy shot down at least seven aircraft on 10 January 1941, in defence of Illustrious, while one Fulmar was lost.  No merchantmen were lost during Excess but the Royal Navy lost one cruiser sunk and a destroyer damaged beyond repair.

See also 
 Battle of the Mediterranean
 Malta Convoys

Notes

Footnotes

Sources

 
 Brown, David Warship Losses of World War II Naval Institute Press (1995) 
 
 
 
 Pack, S.W.C. The Battle for Crete Naval Institute Press (1973) 
 Pegg, Martin Luftwaffe Ground Attack Units 1939–45  Sky Books Press, NY 1977. 
 
 
 Smith, Peter C. Junkers Ju 87 Stuka Crowood Press, Ramsbury, 1998. 
 
 

Balkans campaign (World War II)
Allied naval victories in the battle of the Mediterranean
Malta Convoys
Naval aviation operations and battles
Naval battles and operations of World War II involving the United Kingdom
January 1941 events